Liubymivka may refer to:

 Liubymivka, a village in Beryslav Raion of Kherson Oblast, in Ukraine
 , a settlement in Henichesk Raion of Kherson Oblast, in Ukraine
 Liubymivka, an urban-type settlement in Kakhovka Raion of Kherson Oblast, in Ukraine
 Dzerzhynskyi, renamed Liubymivka by Ukrainian authorities, an urban-type settlement in Luhansk Oblast, Ukraine

See also
 Lyubimovka (disambiguation)